A bronze statue of a seated Benjamin Franklin by John J. Boyle is installed at the University of Pennsylvania in Philadelphia, Pennsylvania. It is located in front of College Hall, on Locust Walk, between 34th and 36th Streets, and is one of three statues of Franklin on the campus.

Details
It was commissioned by department store founder Justus C. Strawbridge in 1896, as a gift to the City of Philadelphia. It was cast by the Henry-Bonnard Bronze Company of New York, and installed in 1899 in front of Philadelphia's Main Post Office, at 9th and Chestnut Streets. Benjamin Franklin was the first United States Postmaster General. The granite pedestal was designed by architect Frank Miles Day. Its inscription quotes President George Washington's eulogy of Franklin:

BENJAMIN FRANKLIN
1706–1790
VENERATED
FOR BENEVOLENCE
ADMIRED FOR TALENTS
ESTEEMED FOR PATRIOTISM
BELOVED FOR
PHILANTHROPY
WASHINGTON

(On back of pedestal):
PRESENTED TO THE CITY OF PHILADELPHIA BY JUSTUS C STRAWBRIDGE 1899
(On back of statue):
JOHN J. BOYLE 1899
HENRY-BONNARD BRONZE CO FOUNDERS NY 1899
GIFT OF JUSTUS C STRAWBRIDGE

A signed Founder's mark also appears on the back of the statue.

In 1938, when the Post Office was razed, the City gave the statue on permanent loan to the University of Pennsylvania. Franklin played a major role in establishing the university. It was relocated to the Penn campus, and rededicated on January 21, 1939.

It was cleaned and reinstalled in 1980.

Replica
A copy of the statue was given by the New England Society to France in 1906. It is located at the Trocadéro in Paris.

Gallery

See also
 Benjamin Franklin in popular culture
 List of public art in Philadelphia

References

External links
 
https://www.flickr.com/photos/universityofpennsylvania/4326061936/
https://web.archive.org/web/20120330062816/http://www.pps.org/great_public_spaces/one?public_place_id=631

1899 establishments in Pennsylvania
1899 sculptures
Philadelphia, College Hall
Bronze sculptures in Pennsylvania
Monuments and memorials in Philadelphia
Outdoor sculptures in Philadelphia
Sculptures of men in Pennsylvania
Statues in Pennsylvania
University of Pennsylvania campus
Relocated buildings and structures in Pennsylvania